Stadtmannia is a genus of flowering plants belonging to the family Sapindaceae.<ref name="POWO">{{cite web |title=Stadtmannia''' Lam. ex Poir.  Plants of the World Online  Kew Science |url=https://powo.science.kew.org/taxon/urn:lsid:ipni.org:names:60475068-2 |website=Plants of the World Online |access-date=25 September 2021 |language=en}}</ref>

Its native range is Kenya to the Northern Provinces, Tanzania and Zimbabwe (in Southern Africa) and the islands of Madagascar and Mauritius, in the western Indian Ocean.

It is listed as being extinct on the island of Réunion, the other species are listed on the IUCN Red lists.

The genus name of Stadtmannia is in honour of Jean Frédéric Stadtmann (1762–1807), a French doctor, botanist and draftsman. 
It was first described and published in J.B.A.M. de Lamarck, Encycl. Vol.7 on page 376 in 1806.

Known species
According to Kew:Stadtmannia acuminata Stadtmannia excelsa Stadtmannia glauca Stadtmannia leandrii Stadtmannia oppositifolia Stadtmannia serrulata''

References

Sapindaceae
Sapindaceae genera
Plants described in 1806
Flora of Kenya
Flora of the Northern Provinces
Flora of Tanzania
Flora of Zimbabwe
Flora of Madagascar
Flora of Mauritius